Fleetwood is an unincorporated community in Ashe County, North Carolina, United States. Fleetwood has a post office with ZIP code 28626, which opened on July 27, 1898.

References

Unincorporated communities in Ashe County, North Carolina
Unincorporated communities in North Carolina